The Nera (Ñara) is a river in the Sakha Republic, Russia, and is a right tributary of the Indigirka.

The Nera freezes up in October and remains icebound until May - early June. A stretch of the R504 Kolyma Highway runs along the river.

Course
The Nera is formed by the confluence of the rivers Delyankir and Khudzhakh in the Nera Plateau, near the border of Yakutia and Magadan Oblast. It flows roughly northeastwards and reaches its mouth at the Indigirka near the gold mining town of Ust-Nera on the Kolyma Highway.

See also
List of rivers of Russia

References

Rivers of the Sakha Republic